Prey for the Shadows is a 1961 French drama film directed by Alexandre Astruc, starring Annie Girardot, Daniel Gélin and Christian Marquand. It is also known as Shadow of Adultery. The original screenplay was written by Astruc, Claude Brulé and Françoise Sagan. The film was released on 14 April 1961. It had 620,504 admissions in France.

Plot
The movie centers on the story of a woman who runs an art gallery and leaves her husband for another man, whom she eventually also leaves but becomes dependent on.

Cast
 Annie Girardot as Anna Kraemmer
 Christian Marquand as Bruno
 Daniel Gélin as Eric Kraemmer
 Michèle Girardon as Anita
 Michèle Gerbier as Claudine
  as Luce
 Christiane Barry as Madame Interlenghi
 Corrado Guarducci as Edoardo Interlengh

Themes
Alexandre Astruc described the main character as "a woman who feels in herself a very real need for freedom that is as much moral as social so that she sets about matching a man's work; but at the same time, because she is a woman, she feels the need to be passive, dominated, submissive."

Production
The film was produced by Les Films Marceau in collaboration with Cocinor - Comptoir Cinématographique du Nord. It was shot from 20 July to 31 August 1960.

References

External links

1961 drama films
1961 films
Films directed by Alexandre Astruc
French drama films
1960s French-language films
1960s French films